Stratagem, Stratagems, or Strategema may refer to:

Books
 Strategemata, or Stratagems, a first-century book by Frontinus
 Stratagems (Polyaenus), or Strategemata, a second-century book by Polyaenus

Media
 "Stratagem" (Star Trek: Enterprise), an episode of Star Trek: Enterprise
 Strategem (album), a 1994 album by Big Head Todd and the Monsters
 Strategema, a game featured in Star Trek
 Strategem, a stage show written by and starring Steve Coogan  as Alan Partridge.

Other uses
Stratagem (deception), or ruse de guerre, a plan or scheme to deceive
 HMS Stratagem (P234), an S class submarine